Jan Barták is a former ice dancer who represented Czechoslovakia. With Jana Beránková, he is the 1981 Prague Skate champion, the 1981 NHK Trophy bronze medalist, the 1982 Ennia Challenge Cup silver medalist, and a two-time Czechoslovak national champion. The duo finished in the top ten at four ISU Championships — 1981 Europeans in Innsbruck, Austria;  1981 Worlds in Hartford, Connecticut, United States; 1982 Europeans in Lyon, France; and 1982 Worlds in Copenhagen, Denmark.

Beránková/Barták teamed up in 1978 and competed together for four seasons. Earlier in his career, Barták skated with Eva Štolfová and Ivana Dírerová. His skating club was TJ Stadion Brno.

Competitive highlights

With Beránková

With Štolfová

References 

Czechoslovak male ice dancers
Living people
Figure skaters from Brno
Year of birth missing (living people)